Pavel Vízner (born 15 July 1970) is a retired professional male tennis player from the Czech Republic. Vízner has reached the French Open final twice, having had turned professional in 1990 and achieved a career high doubles ranking of World No. 5 in November 2007.

Career 
While Vízner had played tournaments in 1988 and 1989 before professionalism in 1990, he won his first title in Prague in 1993 on the Challenger circuit, defeating Swedes Tomas Nydahl and Mikael Tillström in the final, partnered by David Rikl, also a player with a higher doubles ranking and ultimately more success. He won another minor title in Guayaquil, Ecuador later in 1995.

Pavel broke through in 1996, winning a total of five titles; three of them being major titles. His first major title that he won was at Sankt Pölten, with Sláva Doseděl where they defeated David Adams and Menno Oosting in the final. His next title he won with Paul Kilderry over Anders Järryd and number 7 doubles player Mark Knowles in a tournament in Rosmalen, Netherlands. En route, he and partner Kilderry beat the 4th, 7th, 12th, and 14th-ranked doubles players. He won another title yet again in Gstaad, Switzerland, beating David Macpherson and Trevor Kronemann in the final, aside Jiří Novák (a doubles talent in a later day) In Grand Slam men's doubles performance, he participated in the French Open and the U.S. Open, and made the third round at Wimbledon. He ended 1996 ranked 28, having had broken into the top 100 for doubles.

1997 was title dry for Vízner; however he did make the semifinals of the Wimbledon men's doubles tournament with Martin Damm, who yet again thrived as a doubles player. He participated in the Australian Open for the first time, but remained title dry for several years until 2003, and did not reach a final until 1998.

While the years of 1998, 1999 and 2000 were somewhat dull for Vízner title-wise, he did win minor titles in each of these years. He made the finals of tournaments in these three years as well, and lost a close match at the 1999 Wimbledon Championships to 6th-ranked Olivier Delaître and 12th-ranked Fabrice Santoro in the second round of doubles competition along with Peter Tramacchi, in five sets, 4–6, 6–3, 3–6, 6–1, 3–6.

His equalled-best Grand Slam performance to date came in 2001 where he and Petr Pála lost in the final of the 2001 French Open to Indians Mahesh Bhupathi and Leander Paes. Vízner and Pála also made the quarterfinals of the 2001 Wimbledon Championships, but lost to Belarus's Max Mirnyi, ranked 5th, and Belarusian compatriot Vladimir Voltchkov, ranked 406th, despite being up 2–1 in set score. In 2001, he also reached number 13, his highest rank to date.

He dropped out of the top 20 for doubles in 2002, having not won a title and losing early in many events.

2003, however, broke his title drought. He won an International Series Gold tournament in Stuttgart and one other title with compatriot Tomáš Cibulec. He finished the year ranked 27.

In 2004, Pavel won three titles, making them his 6th, 7th and 8th titles of his career. He then went on to lose in the third round of Wimbledon and the quarterfinals of the U.S. Open in 2005 alongside Cyril Suk. He won Costa do Sauípe and Estoril with youngster partner Lukáš Dlouhý in 2006, and the team lost in the semifinals of the French Open.

2007 was a successful year for Vizner, as for the veteran aged 37 teamed with the young Dlouhý. The team defended their Costa do Sauípe title and continued their success to make the finals of Acapulco right after, but lost to Potito Starace and Martín Vassallo Argüello 0–6, 2–6.

He went on to equal his best Grand Slam performance by making the finals of the 2007 French Open men's doubles tournament with Lukáš Dlouhý, notching a win over co-ranked number ones and twin brothers Bob and Mike Bryan, and then beat 2006 Wimbledon runners-up Fabrice Santoro and Nenad Zimonjić. They were to play Mark Knowles and Daniel Nestor in the final. Vízner and Dlouhý easily took the first set 6–2, but then lost the next two and therefore lost to Knowles and Nestor.

Vízner went on to win an ATP Masters Series tournament with Mahesh Bhupathi at the Canada Masters in Montréal. En route, the team took out Leander Paes and Martin Damm, the defending U.S. Open champions of 2006 for men's doubles, and Bob and Mike Bryan in the semifinals. They beat Paul Hanley and Kevin Ullyett in the final.

Vízner returned to partnering with Dlouhý, and made a comeback as a team; as for they beat the Knowles / Nestor team avenging them for their French Open victory at the 2007 Cincinnati Masters. However, their success was halted by the eventual-winning Israeli duo of Jonathan Erlich and Andy Ram. As of 21 August 2007 Vízner is ranked 14, one away from his all-time career-high doubles ranking after 19 years of playing professional tournaments.

Pavel came to make the finals of the 2007 U.S. Open with Dlouhý, but lost in the final to Julian Knowle and Simon Aspelin in two sets. He achieved a career-high ranking of number 6 the week after the U.S. Open. In achieving this, the team again defeated Knowles/Nestor and then Hanley/Ullyett, before losing in the final.

Grand Slam finals

Doubles: 1 runner-up

Career finals

Doubles (16 titles)

Doubles performance timeline

External links
 
 
 
 Tennis academy František Pála - Pavel Vízner - Petr Pála

1970 births
Living people
Czech male tennis players
Czechoslovak male tennis players
Olympic tennis players of the Czech Republic
Tennis players from Prague
Tennis players at the 2008 Summer Olympics